Marie-José Denys (15 March 1950 – 12 January 2022) was a French politician. A member of the Socialist Party, she served in the European Parliament from 1989 to 1994 and again from 1997 to 1999. She died on 12 January 2022, at the age of 71.

References

1950 births
2022 deaths
20th-century French politicians
21st-century French politicians
20th-century French women
21st-century French women
Socialist Party (France) MEPs
MEPs for France 1989–1994
MEPs for France 1994–1999
People from La Rochelle